Sabarimala Railway is a proposed  railway line from  to Erumeli, near Sabarimala that had been sanctioned in the year 1998 by Indian Railways. According to a memorandum of understanding signed between the Kerala State and the Ministry of Railways on 27 January 2016, commercially viable railway projects will be identified and handed over to the Special Purpose Vehicle (SPV) to be fast-tracked on a 51:49 per cent equity basis. The currently proposed Sabarimala railway is under PMO - Proactive government and timely implementation (Pragati); will be monitored by the Prime Minister's Office. 
The proposed railway line will be a great relief to the transportation problems faced by Idukki, Kottayam, and Pathanamthitta districts.Railways have agreed to start the project as soon as Kerala Rail Development Corporation gives the revised estimate for the project.

Project details 

111 km long Angamali- Erumeli Sabari railway is the 1st phase of 250 KMs long Angamali -Erumeli - Pathanamthitta - Punaloor- Nedumangad -Thiruvananthapuram railway line. Angamali -Erumeli - Pathanamthitta - Punaloor- Nedumangad -Thiruvananthapuram railway will provide 25 new railway stations in 5 southern districts of Kerala. Kerala.  The government of Kerala informed Railway Board on 7/1/2021, of its willingness to share 50% of the cost of the Angamali- Erumeli, Sabari railway project. An amount of Rs. 2,000 crores is allocated to this project by the Government of Kerala through the 2021 state budget.  The government started the land acquisition for the construction of this Sabari railway project and established special Thahasildhar offices at Perumbavoor and Palai in 2006 and at Muvattupuzha in 2010 for the land acquisition of Sabari railway. The railway and revenue department has conducted the joint survey for the land acquisition of this railway line, laid a boundary stone for the acquired land, and notified for land acquisition up to the proposed Ramapuram railway station in the Kottayam district. 90% of railway line construction up to Kaladi railway station  was completed by 2010.

The 111 Km long Angamaly – Erumeli Sabari Railway line was originally proposed in the 1997-98 Railway Budget. This work is figuring in Pink Book 2022-23 also. The Project connecting Angamaly to Erumeli, the Gateway to the famous Sabarimala Temple serves as a 3rd rail corridor for Kerala State linking the Idukki district and suburbs in the eastern part of southern Kerala to the Indian Rail network. The new line has 14 stations out of which 10 are crossing stations and 4 halt stations. The line connects Angamali to Erumeli. There is another proposal for a new line from Erumeli to Punalur for which a reconnaissance survey has been done by the Railways. If this line comes through, it will become a third route to Tamil Nadu from Kerala via the Kollam-Sengottai line. The Sabari Railway project has been included under PRAGATI (PM-PRO ACTIVE GOVERNANCE AND TIMELY IMPLEMENTATION) & is monitored by the Prime Minister’s Office.

Stations & their importance	

1. Kaladi 	

Kalady is the birthplace of the great humanitarian and philosopher, Adi Sankaracharya. The place is blessed with many important temples, including shrines dedicated to Sri Sankara, Sarada Devi, Sri Krishna, and Sri Ramakrishna. Festival celebrations here are solemn events that attract believers in large numbers. This location is called Crocodile Ghat and it attracts numerous visitors. The legendary Marthoma Mandapam, in Malayattoor shrine hill church where the relics of 
the great Apostle St.Thomas are preserved, is very near Kaladi. The Golden Cross at Kurishumudi is believed to have formed when St. Thomas knelt on a rock and 
signed a cross with his finger. Another intriguing sight at the hill is the permanent footprint and the marks of knees imprinted on the rock which is believed 
to be that of St. Thomas. This hill shrine over time has emerged as one of the most famous and largest pilgrim centres in the name of St. Thomas in India and 
thousands of devotees congregate here to get his blessings. Rice based industrial cluster of Kerala is located in Kaladi. 90 % of the rice used in Kerala is processed through the industrial units at Kaladi.	  
		 
2. Perumbavoor 
	
450 plywood manufacturing units are located in Perumbavoor. Irapuram KINFRA rubber industrial park is also located in Perumbavoor. Perumbavoor has 3.5 lakh 
migrant labours, working in various industrial units. It is also a commercial center & headquarters of Kunnathunaad Taluk. Thiruvairanikulam Temple is located 
near the Perumbavoor.	  
		 
3. Odakkali 	

The aromatic and Medicinal plants research station located close to the proposed Station has an herbal garden comprising 350 species of medicinal herbs.
	
4. Kothamangalam 	

Kothamangalam is the gateway of the well-known tourist center Munnar which is also called Southern Kashmeer. Eravikulam National Park,  Bhoothaankett dam & the famous bird sanctuary in Thattekad are very near to Kothamangalam. The famous furniture industrial cluster is located in Nellikuzhy on the outskirt of Kothamangalam. It is a commercial center & headquarters of Kothamangalam Taluk.	 
		 
5. Muvattupuzha 	

Muvattupuzha is a growing urban Centre of central Kerala & Head quarter of Muvattupuzha Taluk. A number of higher educational institutions are located here. KINFRA industrial park is located in Nellad near Muvattupuzha. 	 

6. Vazhakulam	

Vazhakulam is the biggest pineapple market in India. Vazhakkulam Pineapple is famous across the country and is transported by trucks all over India.
	 
7. Thodupuzha	

Thodupuzha is the commercial capital of the Idukki district & gateway of Idukki. It is the headquarter of Thudupuzha Taluk also. Tourist destinations like Idukki arch dam, Kulamave dam, Malankara tourism hub, Pullikkaanam, Elaveezhapoonchira, Thommankutthu & Aanachadikutthu water falls, Ramakkalmedu, etc. are within short leads from Thodupuzha. 	 
		 
8. Karimkunnam	

Karimkunnam will be the nearest railway station for Moolamattam FCI Godown in the Idukki district. It will also be the nearest railway station for the industrial cluster in KINFRA Spices Park, Muttam, Thodupuzha 	 

9. Ramapuram	

Ramapuram houses the temple of Rama as well as his three brothers (4 Temples) in a  radius of just 3.5 km. Lakshmana at Koodappulam, Bharata at Amanakara, and     Shatrughna at Methiri. The ancient twin-church complex at Ramapuram consists of a smaller church dedicated to St. Augustine and a larger one dedicated to the     Blessed Virgin. While the church dedicated to St. Augustine dates back to around 1450, the one dedicated to the Blessed Virgin was erected in 1864. The tomb of the saintly Thevarparampil Kunjachan is in St. Augustine’s church. Pope John Paul II has declared him 'The Venerable' for the heroic practice of virtues of this saintly priest. Later Church declared his beatification and canonized him. Thousands of Christian devotees are visiting his tomb for blessings. 

10. Bharananganam for Pala	

Tomb of St. Alphonsa is located in Bharananganam shrine church. It is an important Christian pilgrim center of Kerala and thousands of Christian devotees are    visiting Bharananganam. it is also the gate way to famous hill stations like Vagaman, Elappara, Illikkakallu etc. Pala is one of the important education centers of Kerala and 2nd largest commercial center of Kottayam district. It is the head quarter of Meenachil Taluk. Number of ancient Christian pilgrim centers like Pala old church, Cherppungal church, Kizhathadiyoor church and Lalam old church etc. are around Pala. 			 
		 
11. Chemmalamattam	

It is the nearest railway station to important commercial center Eraattupetta. St. George Church Aruvithura & 12 Apostles church Chemmalamattam are important     pilgrim centers of the area. engathanam water fall situates near to chemmalamattam station.
	
12. Kanjirapally Road	

Kanjirapally is the cradle of rubber production in Kerala. It is also a commercial center & headquarter of Kanjirapally Taluk. It is the nearest railway station for tourist centers and hill stations like Thekkady, Peermedu, Parunthumpara, Kuttikkanam etc.	 

13. Erumeli	for Sabarimala

It is the gateway of Sabarimala shrine temple. Pettathullal, also known as Petta Kettu, is a historic ritualistic dance held annually at Erumeli. An important element is that of 'Kanni Ayyappas', where the first-timers to Sabarimala must participate in the thullal by holding a arrow. Visiting The Vavar mosque at Erumeli by the Ayyappa devotees is an important ritual of Sabarimala pilgrimage. Erumeli is also called as center of religious fraternity of the country. Survey conducted for the extension of Sabari railway line to Punaloor via Ranni, Pathanamthitta, Konni, Koodal, Pathanapuram and there by connecting it with Kollam-Sengottai railway line is also planned.	 
		 
		 
The alignment traverses places that are culturally religiously & commercially important in addition to a number of tourist spots. There are a lot of important tourist destinations flanking the alignment. As can be seen from the table above, there is no station that is not important on the above lines. It will also link the Idukki district of Kerala to the Indian Railway Map. The stations enrooted are Kaladi, Perumbavoor, Odakkali, Kothamangalam, Muvattupuzha, Vazhakulam, Thodupuzha, Karimkunnam, Ramapuram, Bharananganam for Pala, Chemmalamattom,  Kanjirappally Road & Erumeli for Sabarimala. The road traffic in this sector has almost reached a saturation point resulting in inordinate delays and unpredictable roadblocks which has adversely affected travel in this sector which is badly in need of a public transport system to alleviate the road travel hazards.

PROJECT UPDATE

	Govt of Kerala vide GO. No1/2021 Trans Dt 07.01.2021 has conveyed the willingness to share 50% cost of the project.

	Railway Board has advised the Joint Venture Company, Keral Rail Development Corporation Limited (KRDCL) to revise the detailed estimate and prepare the DPR.

	Keral Rail Development Corporation Limited (KRDCL) has submitted the revised estimate of the Angamaly – Sabari Project to Southern Railway on 21.03.2022 for an estimated value of Rs.3454 crores.

	Consequently, DPR has been prepared and submitted to Southern Railway on 18.06.2022.

	The General Manager of Southern Railway has accorded approval to process the detailed estimate and DPR for sanction of the Railway Board and forwarded the same to 
Railway Board on 21.07.2022.

	The portion of the project from Angamali to Kaladi for a length of 8 km has already been 99% completed by 2016 but not commissioned. Railway has spent about 264 
crores for the project.

	The state govt had earlier set up land acquisition offices for the project and LA for the project up to Ramapuram was in various stages of progress. However the consequence of the freezing of the project by Railways, the state government has stopped all LA activities and closed the field offices also.

	Railway Board was requested to sanction the revised estimate, defreeze the project, and provide sufficient funds, and permission to go ahead with the land acquisition.

A meeting conducted on 14/11/2022 with the higher officials of Prime Minister Gati Shakthi Project, Railway Board, and Krail has decided to update the revised estimate of Sabari railway for Vande Bharat train service.

KRail has assured us that they will submit the revised estimate of Sabari railway with the Vande Bharat train service facility on 27/11/2022.

Railway Board has directed the zonal offices to examine the possibility of providing railway connectivity to towns having more than 50,000 population. The inclusion of Nedumangad Municipality in the list has increased the Chance for  expansion of the Sabari railway to Thiruvananthapuram.

Stations 
Proposed new railway stations in  Phase I are Angamaly  (Railway Station already exists), Kalady, Perumbavoor, Odakkali, Kothamangalam, Muvattupuzha, Vazhakulam, Thodupuzha, Karimkunnam, Ramapuram, Bharananganam for Pala, Chemmalamattam, Kanjirappally Road and Erumeli. 

Since it provides a railway facility to Sabarimala pilgrims and the number of pilgrims visiting Sabarimala temple is more than the total population of Kerala, this railway line was named Sabari railway.

Stations in Phase-1

 Angamaly  (Railway Station already exists)
 Kalady
 Perumbavoor
 Odakkali
 Kothamangalam
 Muvattupuzha
 Vazhakulam
 Thodupuzha
 Karimkunnam
 Ramapuram
 Bharananganam for Pala
 Chemmalamattam
 Kanjirappally Road
 Erumeli for Sabarimala

Stations in Phase-2
 Erumeli for Sabarimala
 Ranni
 Pathanamthitta Road
 Konni
 Koodal
 Pathanapuram 
 Punalur  (Railway Station already exists)

Stations in Phase-3

 Punalur (Station already exists)
 Anchal
 Kadakkal
 Nedumangad
 Nemom for Trivandrum (Station already exists)
 Vizhinjam Port

References

External links 

Rail transport in Kerala
Thiruvananthapuram railway division
Proposed railway lines in India
Transport in Ernakulam district
Transport in Kottayam district
Transport in Kollam district
5 ft 6 in gauge railways in India